The Salmon River is a river in the Shuswap region of British Columbia, Canada.

The river arises in the mountains between Kamloops and Kelowna. It flows west to Salmon Lake, then issues northeastward and descends into a broad valley near Westwold. It then runs east along the route of Highway 97 past the town of Falkland before turning north again through the Silver Creek area to flow into the Salmon Arm of Shuswap Lake at Salmon Arm.

For several kilometres upstream and downstream of Westwold the river runs through a deep gravel bed; in this section it has no surface flow except during freshet in any year that is not exceptionally wet. This presents a barrier to migratory fish.

The river takes its name from the numerous salmon that spawned in the river prior to 1914, the year of the Hell's Gate Slide. Since then the salmon run has been very small, and salmon fishing is prohibited.

Rivers of British Columbia
Salmon Arm